Nothing Is Wasted is the second live album from the American contemporary worship band Elevation Worship recorded at Elevation Blakeney. The album was released on February 18, 2013 by Provident Label Group.

Critical reception

AllMusic's Steve Legget rated the album five stars, calling it "a success on both a spiritual and commercial level". Jono Davies of Louder Than The Music gave the album four and a half stars out of five, saying that "This concept is a great idea. Sometimes live albums aren't the most creative of albums, but when a song is taken into the studio you can spend time working out different sounds and styles to create the definitive version. So depending on the mood you are in, you can experience this album in two different styles." with reference to the deluxe edition of Nothing Is Wasted which contained studio versions of the songs as well. Davies concluded that the deluxe edition is "A great double album, with great worship songs performed in two very different ways."

Track listing

Chart performance

References

2013 live albums
Elevation Worship albums